Fan Liang is a Paralympian athlete from China competing mainly in category F54 discus events.

Fan has won the discus in two Paralympics, he won the F54 class in 2004 and the combined F53/54 class in 2008

References

Paralympic athletes of China
Athletes (track and field) at the 2004 Summer Paralympics
Athletes (track and field) at the 2008 Summer Paralympics
Paralympic gold medalists for China
Living people
Chinese male discus throwers
Medalists at the 2004 Summer Paralympics
Medalists at the 2008 Summer Paralympics
Year of birth missing (living people)
Paralympic medalists in athletics (track and field)
20th-century Chinese people
21st-century Chinese people